This list includes the awards and nominations of the Iranian film director and screenwriter Asghar Farhadi. In addition to these awards, Farhadi has received awards and nominations from film festivals and organizations all around the world.

As of 2021, Two of his films have won Academy Award for Best International Feature Film: A Separation  (2011) and  The Salesman (2016). He was also nominated for Academy Award for Best Original Screenplay for A Separation.

Major associations

Academy Awards

British Academy Film Awards

Golden Globe Awards

Film festival

Berlin International Film Festival

Cannes Film Festival

Toronto International Film Festival

Tribeca Film Festival

Foreign associations

César Awards

Goya Awards

Independent Spirit Awards

References 

Lists of awards received by film director
Iranian film directors